National Route 2 is a national highway in South Korea that connects Sinan with Busan. It was first established on 31 August 1971. The original road connected Mokpo to Busan, but in 2004, a road that connects Sinan to Mokpo opened to traffic.

Main stopovers
South Jeolla Province
 Sinan County - Mokpo - Muan County - Yeongam County - Gangjin County - Jangheung County - Boseong County - Suncheon - Gwangyang
South Gyeongsang Province
 Hadong County - Sacheon - Jinju - Changwon 
Busan
 Gangseo District - Saha District - Seo District - Jung District

Major intersections

 (■): Motorway
IS: Intersection, IC: Interchange

South Jeolla Province

South Gyeongsang Province

Busan

References

2
Roads in South Jeolla
Roads in South Gyeongsang
Roads in Busan